Sylvia of Aquitaine was a fourth century pilgrim from Aquitaine. She was the sister of Rufinus, the chief minister of the Byzantine Empire under Theodosius and Arcadius. Palladius' Lausiac History tells she journeyed in the age of 60, and prided in her ascetic habits.

In the late 19th century she was thought the author of a detailed pilgrimage account, which is now attributed to Egeria.

Her feast day is celebrated on November 5th and she is the patron saint of pregnant women. She is not to be confused with Sylvia, the mother of Pope Gregory the Great .

References

4th-century Christian saints
4th-century Byzantine women